David Hope Sadler (October 12, 1882 – August 29, 1931) was an American football player for John Heisman's Clemson Tigers of Clemson University. He was captain of the SIAA champion 1902 and 1903 Clemson Tigers football teams coached by Heisman, selected All-Southern the same years. One publication reads "Vetter Sitton and Hope Sadler were the finest ends that Clemson ever had perhaps." Sitton played on the left; Sadler on the right.

Early years
Hope Sadler was born on October 12, 1882 in York County, South Carolina to Rufus Earle Sadler and Lillian Emily Crawford.

College football
In the "1903 SIAA championship game" against the Cumberland Bulldogs, which opened its season with an upset of Vanderbilt, the winning team was to be awarded the ball. The game ended in an 11–11 tie. Captain W. W. Suddarth of Cumberland wanted captain Sadler to get the ball, and Sadler insisted Suddarth should have it.  Some ten minutes of bickering was resolved when the ball was given to patrolman Patrick J. Sweeney, for warning the media and fans to stay down in front and allow spectators to see the game.

High school football
Sadler coached the University School for Boys in Stone Mountain, Georgia in 1904. Later Oglethorpe coach Frank B. Anderson was an assistant.

References

External links
 

1882 births
1931 deaths
American football ends
Clemson Tigers football players
All-Southern college football players
High school football coaches in Georgia (U.S. state)
People from York County, South Carolina
Players of American football from South Carolina